Jesús Enrique Sánchez (born October 7, 1997) is a Dominican professional baseball outfielder for the Miami Marlins of Major League Baseball (MLB). He made his MLB debut in 2020.

Career

Tampa Bay Rays
Sánchez signed with the Tampa Bay Rays as an international free agent in June 2014. He made his professional debut in 2015 with the Dominican Summer League Rays and spent the whole season there, slashing .335/.382/.498 with four home runs and 45 RBIs in 61 games. Sánchez played 2016 with the Gulf Coast Rays and Princeton Rays, compiling a combined .329 batting average with seven home runs, 39 RBIs, and a .900 OPS in 56 total games between the two teams, and 2017 with the Bowling Green Hot Rods where he batted .305 with 15 home runs and 82 RBIs in 117 games.

Sánchez began 2018 with the Charlotte Stone Crabs. He was named to the 2018 MLB Futures Game and played for the World team. Sánchez was also named the Charlotte Stone Crabs MVP for the 2018 season after batting .301/.331/.462 with ten home runs and 64 RBIs in ninety games. He also played in 27 games for the Montgomery Biscuits at the end of the year, hitting .214.

The Rays added Sánchez to their 40-man roster after the 2018 season. He began 2019 with Montgomery.

Miami Marlins
On July 31, 2019, Sánchez and Ryne Stanek were traded to the Miami Marlins in exchange for Nick Anderson and Trevor Richards. 

On August 20, 2020, Sánchez was promoted to the major leagues. He made his major league debut the next day as the starting right fielder against the Washington Nationals.

On May 30, 2022, Sánchez hit a 496 foot home run vs Ryan Feltner at Coors Field, the longest home run since Nomar Mazara in 2019. It was also one of the 5 longest home runs since the Statcast era began in 2015.

References

External links

1997 births
Living people
People from La Altagracia Province
Major League Baseball players from the Dominican Republic
Dominican Republic expatriate baseball players in the United States
Major League Baseball outfielders
Miami Marlins players
Dominican Summer League Rays players
Gulf Coast Rays players
Princeton Rays players
Bowling Green Hot Rods players
Charlotte Stone Crabs players
Montgomery Biscuits players
Durham Bulls players
New Orleans Baby Cakes players
Toros del Este players
Jacksonville Jumbo Shrimp players